Gorai ([ɡoɾaːi]) is a village at Dharavi Bhet, in Mumbai, India. It is located on the North-western part of the island of Salsette. Gorai is accessed more usually by a ferry crossing the Manori Creek and Gorai creek or otherwise by the overland route through Bhayander. Gorai is bordered by the villages of Manori and Uttan, Pali, Chowk, Dongri, Tarodi, Rai, Morva and Murdhe.

Until the 1980s, Gorai was known for its clean beaches and palm trees. However, with the increase in pollution around Mumbai, the Arabian Sea is unfit for swimming although Gorai is less polluted than the other beaches in Mumbai. Gorai still enjoys its calm, laid back charm quite in contrast to the fast-paced life of the city just on the other side of the creek. Bullock carts are still in use here and the area suffers from a water shortage but with real-estate developers steadily bulldozing their way into this prized suburban tract, the physical and cultural fabric of the villagers of Gorai is now quite endangered.

The Essel World, the first and the biggest amusement park of India, was built in Gorai in 1986. The park has several rides that cater to all age groups, and is known for its colossal infrastructure. The Global Vipassana Pagoda, featuring the tallest pillar-less dome in the world, a place for meditation, is built on 13 acres of land near Gorai. It is similar in shape to the Shwedagon Pagoda in Yangon, Myanmar.

Dharavi Island

The peninsula protruding off the north-west of Salsette island known as Dharavi Bhet once used to be an  island called Dharavi, part of a group of Islands off the Salsette coast separated by the Manori Creek that connected to the Vasai Creek. Versova, Marve and Rai Murdhe were the names of the other islands. These islands remained separate till as late as 1825 when

Col. Jervis's map showed the west coast of Salsette broken into eight large and four small islands. In 1882, one could walk across the tidal inlets during low tides to reach these islands. The island of Dharavi, however, had to be reached by a boat.
However, with the building of the railways over the Ghodbunder Creek, and with successive urbanization and reclamation of the tidal inlets, the Island is now effectively a peninsula attached to Salsette Island. North Dharavi Island which falls in the Thane district while the south is included in the Mumbai Suburban district.

Portuguese history
Gorai has a large East Indian population. East Indians are Roman Catholics who were converted by the Portuguese when they arrived here in the 16th century. Gorai has three churches.  The oldest one, Reis Magos or the Three Magi, on the banks of the Vairalla Tank located on the north border of Gorai, was built by the Franciscan missionaries between 1595 & 1602. The newer parish church, also named after the Three Magi, was built in 1810, and is located about three-quarters of a mile to the south of the ruined, original parish church.  The third is the Infant Jesus Chapel built near the ruins of the old church.

Major issues facing Gorai

Ecological degradation
Coastal waters off Mumbai are rising at 0.3 degrees per decade. The sea level of the Mumbai coast is rising at an average of 1.2 mm a year. In Manori and Gorai together, the average annual fish catch dropped from 18,400 tonnes for the five-year period from 1994-95 to 98-99 to 13,354 tonnes for the period 2004-05 to 2008-09.

Toxic waste dumping
Villagers of Uttan, Palkhadi, Talavli, Anandnagar, Dongri, Tarodi, Pali, Chowk and Morva are protesting against the operators of dumping grounds sitting atop the Dhavgi Hill right in the center of the nine villages. This dumping ground is set up on Collectors land that was transferred to the Mira Bhayander Municipal Corporation who in turn has leased it for a period of 30 years to a private garbage disposal company. Though the civic body claims to spray chemicals to keep away the stink, villagers say that the foul smell is getting unbearable and leading to health issues among the residents.

References 

Neighbourhoods in Mumbai
Villages in Mumbai Suburban district